Giorgi Mamardashvili (born 29 September 2000) is a Georgian professional footballer who plays as a goalkeeper for La Liga club Valencia and the Georgia national team.

Club career

Dinamo Tbilisi
Born in Tbilisi, Mamardashvili joined Dinamo Tbilisi's youth setup in 2012, from Gagra. After featuring as an unused substitute in the first team for the most of the 2018 season, he was loaned to Rustavi for the 2019 campaign.

Rustavi

Mamardashvili made his senior debut on 2 March 2019, starting in a 4–1 away loss against Locomotive Tbilisi. After contributing with 28 appearances and helping his side to avoid relegation, he moved to Locomotive also on loan.

Locomotive Tbilisi

The goalkeeper was widely hailed during Locomotive's UEFA Europa League campaign in 2020. According to newspaper Marca, his great performance against Granada drew attention from Spanish scouts. 

In late December he received the Best Goalkeeper of the Year award from Georgian Football Federation. 

His great skills did not go unnoticed at the UEFA, either, when it published a list of 50 young talents expected to shine in 2021.

Valencia
On 7 June 2021, Mamardashvili joined Spanish club Valencia on a one-year loan deal, with a buyout clause, and was initially assigned to the reserves in Tercera División RFEF. He made the pre-season with the main squad, impressing the manager José Bordalás and earning himself the starting spot in the league opener against Getafe on 13 August, which ended 1–0 for Los Che.

On 31 December 2021, Valencia confirmed the permanent signing of Mamardashvili on a contract until 2024, with an option for a further year.

During this season Giorgi Mamardashvili participated in 18 league matches with eight clean sheets. He recorded 560 minutes in a row without conceding a goal.

He was twice included in the La Liga's symbolic team of the week (Matchweeks 1 and 35). Additionally, he received the King of the Match award on three occasions.

In May 2022, Marca named Mamardashvili in the La Liga's Discovery of the Season team.

International career
After making three appearances for the Georgia U21 team, Mamardashvili made his debut for the senior national team against Bulgaria in a 4–1 friendly defeat on 8 September 2021.

He played his first official match against N.Macedonia in a Nations League 3–0 win on 9 June 2022. Due to his performance in the return leg (2–0) in September, Mamardashvili was named in Team of the Week after round 5, and whoscored.com included him in monthly and seasonal Best XI of Group C.

Career statistics

Club

Honours

Dinamo Tbilisi

2018 Erovnuli Liga runner up

Valencia

2021-22 Copa Del Rey runner up

References

External links
Profile at the Valencia CF website

2000 births
Living people
Footballers from Tbilisi
Footballers from Georgia (country)
Association football goalkeepers
Georgia (country) international footballers
Georgia (country) under-21 international footballers
Erovnuli Liga players
FC Dinamo Tbilisi players
FC Metalurgi Rustavi players
FC Lokomotivi Tbilisi players
La Liga players
Valencia CF players
Expatriate footballers from Georgia (country)
Expatriate sportspeople from Georgia (country) in Spain
Expatriate footballers in Spain